The 2010 Tallahassee Tennis Challenger was a professional tennis tournament played on outdoor hard courts. It was part of the 2010 ATP Challenger Tour. It took place in Tallahassee, United States between 17 and 24 April 2010.

ATP entrants

Seeds

 Rankings are as of April 12, 2010.

Other entrants
The following players received wildcards into the singles main draw:
  Jean-Yves Aubone
  Brendan Evans
  Bobby Reynolds
  Tim Smyczek

The following players received Special Exempt into the singles main draw:
  Santiago González
  Go Soeda

The following players received entry from the qualifying draw:
  Jamie Baker
  Joshua Goodall
  Luka Gregorc
  Dayne Kelly

Champions

Singles

 Brian Dabul def.  Robby Ginepri, 4–6, 4–0, Ret.

Doubles

 Stephen Huss /  Joseph Sirianni def.  Robert Kendrick /  Bobby Reynolds, 6–2, 6–4

References

ITF search 

Tallahassee Tennis Challenger
Tennis tournaments in the United States
Tallahassee Tennis Challenger